The Skh-1 (SyelskolKhozyaistyennyi - agricultural), (a.k.a. LIG-10 (Leningradskii Institoot Grazdahnskovo Vozdooshnovo Flota-  Leningrad Institute civil air fleet)), was a transport/utility aircraft designed and built in the USSR from 1936.

Development 
In 1930 the LIIPS ( - Leningrad institute for sail and communications engineers) formed a UK GVF ( - training centre for civil air fleet), in turn the UK GVF formed the NIAI (Naoochno-Issledovatel'skiy Aero-Institoot - scientific test aero-institute) which became the focus of several good design engineers who were given command of individual OKB (Osboye Konstrooktorskoye Byuro – personal design/construction bureau).

The SKh-1 utility transport was designed by Anatolii Georgievich Bedunkovich as a multi-purpose utility transport biplane of mixed construction with wooden folding wings, fitted with slotted ailerons and flaps on all four trailing edges, a welded mild steel tubing fuselage and wooden tail-section with fabric covering. A fixed wide track tail-wheel undercarriage ensured stability when manoeuvring on the ground and for take-off and landing. The cabin accommodated eight, as a passenger transport, or four stretchers plus attendants in casevac (casualty evacuation), 690 kg of cargo or 600 kg of agricultural chemical powder with a ventral spreader. Flight testing was begun in 1937 and continued throughout the Finnish war from 1939-1940 in seed sowing, casevac and other roles. Production was authorised early in 1941 but the GAZ chosen to produce the Skh-1 was evacuated after the German invasion of 1941 (Operation Barbarossa). Although regarded by some as the ancestor of the An-2 the SKh-1/LIG-10 was not directly related to the later aircraft despite the prototype An-2 also carrying the SKh-1 designation.

Specifications ( SKh-1)

See also
 List of aircraft

References

 Gunston, Bill. “The Osprey Encyclopaedia of Russian Aircraft 1875 – 1995”. London, Osprey. 1995. 

1930s Soviet civil utility aircraft
NIAI aircraft
Aircraft first flown in 1937